Betsy Fischer Martin (born February 17, 1970) is an American Emmy-winning journalist and former TV news executive at NBC's “Meet the Press,” the longest-running program in television history. She is currently the Executive Director of the Women & Politics Institute at American University and the Executive-in-Residence. Martin is also a Fellow in the Center for Congressional and Presidential Studies at American University. She is a member of the International Advisory Council of APCO Worldwide and she is the founder, and principal, of her own consulting business, Fischer Martin Media, where she specializes in offering media training to corporate executives.

Biography

Early life and education 
Betsy Fischer Martin was born in New Orleans, Louisiana, United States, on February 17, 1970. Her mother, Sally F. Pomeroy, was a member of the New Orleans Opera Chorus and retired as a piano and voice teacher in Metairie, Louisiana. Her father, Rev. George J. Fischer, retired as the pastor of First Union Presbyterian Church in Luling, Louisiana.

Betsy Fischer Martin attended Grace King High School, a public high school located in Metairie, Louisiana, which she graduated from in 1988. She obtained both her undergraduate and graduate degrees from American University in Washington D.C. She completed her B.A. in 1992 (Cum Laude) with a major in justice and a minor in political science. She obtained an M.A in 1996 in journalism and public affairs. During her time at American University she was also a research assistant at the Center for Congressional and Presidential Studies.

Marriage and children 
In 2012 Martin married Jonathan Lansing Martin. She has one daughter from her previous marriage, and lives with her husband in Falls Church, Virginia.

Career 
Martin began her career by interning in 1991 at NBC's Political/Poling Unit and “Meet the Press,” in Washington D.C. Within this department at NBC from 1991 to 2002 she moved through the ranks achieving the positions of Researcher, Associate Producer, Producer, and Senior Producer with “Meet the Press.” 

She worked closely for 17 years with her mentor, Tim Russert, producing his interviews on “Meet the Press” as well as producing NBC's coverage for the political elections, including four presidential elections (1992, 1996, 2000, 2004). This coverage included the primaries, party conventions, debates, and election night broadcasts.

In 2002 she became the Executive Producer of “Meet the Press,” a position that she held for 11 years. During this time, she oversaw all editorial content, guest-selection, strategic planning, production, marketing, special online programming, and financial decision-making for the program. In total, she was the Executive Producer of more than 600 live national broadcasts of “Meet the Press.” 

In 2008, she produced NBC's coverage of the presidential election for Tom Brokaw - including party conventions, debates, and election night - as well as one of the three general election debates between McCain and Obama, which he moderated (October 7, 2008 in Nashville, Tennessee). She was also the Anchor Producer for David Gregory for NBC's Special coverage of the 2012 presidential election.

Later, from 2013–2014, she was the Managing Editor of Political Programming at NBC News. In this position she was responsible for the development and execution of network political coverage at NBC News. In total, she spent 23 years with NBC News.

Martin left NBC News in 2014, and until 2016 was a Contributing Editor for Washington MORE Magazine where she interviewed female political leaders about policy issues, women's empowerment and leadership skills. Some of her notable interviews included Condoleezza Rice (April 2015), Nikki Haley (October 2015), and Samantha Power (February 2016).

In 2016 Martin was a Contributor for Bloomberg Politics. Notably, in 2016 she was the Co-host for Bloomberg News’ “Masters in Politics” Podcast. This political podcast featured interviews and discussions with presidential candidates, government officials, and key strategists. Some of her prominent interviews were: Ted Cruz, Jeb Bush, Lindsey Graham, Sean Spicer, and Trevor Noah.

Additionally, Martin has traveled extensively on behalf of the State Department's Bureau of International Information Programs, speaking to foreign journalists, students and political/civic organizations as an independent expert on United States elections, women in politics, and women in media. In 2016 she was a guest speaker for this program in Cambodia where she addressed the 2016 U.S. Presidential Campaign/Women in U.S. Politics and in 2018 she was a guest speaker for the program in Canada where she discussed the Media Influence and the U.S. Midterms on behalf of the Department of State.

Martin is currently the Executive Director of the Women and Politics Institute at American University. Here she is also the Executive in Residence for the School of Public Affairs where she teaches courses on political communication. She also teaches media skills for the SPA Analytics and Management Institute.

Published works 

 2018 – Tim Russert: Loss and Lessons a Decade Later, From NBC News
 2016 – “Masters in Politics” Podcast, Bloomberg News
 2016 – Klobuchar Says She's Unsure Clinton Would Stick With Garland for Court, From Bloomberg News
 2016 – Carson Says Trump Doesn't Need to Apologize for Putin Praise
 2016 – RNC's Spicer Says Trump Can Drain the Swamp with Establishment Help, From Bloomberg News
 2015 – “TRIAL TALK” Podcast
 2013 – Remembering Tim Russert, From NBC News

Honours, decorations, awards and distinctions 

 2017 – Women and Politics Institute, Alice Paul Award, Alumna Recipient
 2017 – National Press Club, President's Award
 2012 – Emmy Award Winner, National Capital Region
 2008 – Emmy Award Winner, National Television Academy
 2008 – Young Global Leader, World Economic Forum
 2005 – Emmy Award Winner, National Television Academy
 2005 – Wilbur Award, Religion Communicators Council 
 2006 – Emmy Nomination, National Television Academy
 2004 – Gracie Award, American Women in Radio and Television
 2004 – USC Annenberg/Walter Cronkite Award for Excellence in Political Journalism
 2002 – USC Annenberg/Walter Cronkite Award for Excellence in Political Journalism
 2000 – USC Annenberg/Walter Cronkite Award for Excellence in Political Journalism
1997 – Emmy Nomination, National Television Academy

References/Notes and references 

1970 births
Living people
American University alumni
American women journalists
Political journalists
NBC News people
News & Documentary Emmy Award winners
American women television producers
American podcasters
21st-century American women